Sin Sun-seong was a captain of the Imperial Korean Navy and known as one of the first naval figures of the Korean Empire.

Biography
Sin Sun-seong was born in Hanseong in 1878. While studying at Kumamoto Commercial School, he obtained a preliminary navigator qualification and entered Tokyo Higher Merchant Marine School in 1897.

On August 28, 1910, on the eve of the Japan–Korea Treaty of 1910, Sin took down the Taegeukgi from the ship at Gwangjeho Lake and carefully stored it before donating the flag to the state where it is currently preserved at the Incheon Naval Museum. When Chosun First Co., Ltd. was founded in 1912, he transferred the Guangjae to the company and he worked as a captain of the current merchant ship. After the Incheon Haewon Training Center opened in 1919, the Guangjae was re-purposed as a training ship and Sun served as the training instructor of the ship and continued this all the way until 1938 when Sin retired. In 1917, Sin moved to Incheon with his family and later died there on February 7, 1944.

References

1878 births
1944 deaths
People from Seoul
People from Incheon
Imperial Korean military personnel